Radyo Natin is a community radio network owned by Manila Broadcasting Company. It has more than 100 stations across the Philippines spread from Aparri in the northernmost part to Bongao in the south. The network also runs its main feed known as Radyo Natin Nationwide, which broadcasts on 96.3 FM's HD2 channel.

Unlike MBC's radio brands, Radyo Natin enacts as a "network-community" station operated by different local entities (both companies and individuals) under an entrepreneurship/franchise agreement with the network.

History
Radyo Natin was launched by the MBC on December 16, 1997 as a replacement for the short-lived Community Radio Network (ComNet). Back then, its original programming consists of DZRH hook-up programming on mornings, local programming from late morning to early evenings, and the controversial religious program Ang Dating Daan on mid-evenings until sign-off.

In mid-2017 (and prior to the 20th anniversary of the network), most of the Hot FM stations switched to the Radyo Natin brand, thus dissolving the Hot FM branding. In turn, Radyo Natin now has over 120 stations.

On October 2, 2019, the main studios and satellite uplink facilities of Radyo Natin Nationwide at the MBC Building, CCP Complex in Pasay, along with its sister MBC radio stations, were affected by a major fire that originated in the nearby Star City theme park. In interim, Radyo Natin beamed its broadcasts from its backup studios at BSA Twin Towers in Ortigas, while most of their local stations are temporarily suspended its network hookup from its satellite uplink facility and temporarily replaced with local music/fillers programs until January 2022.

On November 15, 2021, Radyo Natin Nationwide relaunched its new logo along with the new logos of all MBC radio stations and its new corporate slogan, Sama-Sama Tayo, Pilipino! (lit. We are all Filipinos!). In February 2022, after a 3 year hiatus, the central studios of Radyo Natin Nationwide returned to the newly renovated MBC Building inside the Star City complex.

Composition and network synopsis

Programming
All Radyo Natin stations operate in the FM band. Each of them airs a hometown radio format, with the weekday morning schedule consisting of local programming cleared to each affiliate station from 4:00 a.m. to 5:00 a.m. and from 8:30 a.m. to 1:00 p.m., and a simulcast of DZRH, the flagship AM station of MBC, from 5:00 a.m. to 7:00 a.m. Weekend mornings and Sunday afternoons until 7:00 p.m. are also cleared in the same format.

Network-level afternoon programming is fed to all stations every Monday to Saturday at 1:00 p.m. before going to a two-hour local programming window for stations from 5:00 p.m. to 7:00 p.m. Primetime network shows conclude with Evenings with Dennis and Jay on Mondays to Fridays and Gladly Yours on Sundays, until the network feed signs off at 10:00 p.m. By local discretion, stations may air local late-night fare after the network feed by omitting the closing prayer intended for stations closing down at midnight or sign-off altogether by seamlessly playing the local station's sign-off sequence after the feed.

Technology

From its central studios at the MBC Building within the Star City Complex in Pasay, Radyo Natin signals its stations via satellite technology. The stations then broadcast the signals to their respective areas of responsibility.

Radyo Natin used to operate two kinds of low-power FM stations. The first one operates with a transmitter power of 500 watts but with an effective radiated power (ERP) of 1 kilowatt. The other one had much lower power (100 watts); these stations were allowed to operate by the NTC with permits issued during the time of Commissioner Rio. However, the same permits were recalled during the time of NTC Commissioner Borje. Currently, most Radyo Natin stations broadcast at 500 watts and 1 kilowatt designated for smaller provinces but few stations broadcast on a full-power 5 kilowatt or 10 kilowatt signal designated for major market cities.

Proposed TV companion
TV Natin was in the pipeline, originally as part of the Radyo Natin project, but it was never launched. RHTV instead was launched as a separate MBC venture and not even under the division of DZRH.

In December 2008, TV Natin changed to DZRH RadyoVision, now DZRH News Television.

Personalities

Anchors
 Angelo Palmones (also with DZRH)
 Glady Mabini (also with DZRH)
 Mae Binauhan (also with DZRH)
 Beth Vetonio

Disc Jockeys
 Cheska San Diego-Bobadilla (also with DZRH)
 Dennis Lazo
 Kleir Pineda
 Atty. Ethel Aldea
 Jay Perillo
 Ellanie "Valeen Kinitan" Bensal (also with DZRH)
 Faith "Maja Limuyak" Salaver (also with DZRH)
 DJ Eduard
 DJ Fatima

Programming
*Simulcast with DZRH and DZRH TV

Network programs

News/talk
 RH Balita*
 Magandang Umaga Pilipinas*
 ACS Balita*
 Radyo Natin Nationwide (with Angelo Palmones and DJ Elanie)

Specialty
 Ang Galing Mo Doc*
 Lunas (with Dennis Lazo)
 Negosyo Atbp.*

Music and entertainment
 Chillax Time (with DJ Elanie)
 Tugstugan (with DJ Faith)
 Evenings with Dennis and Jay (with Dennis and Jay)
 BFF (with Atty. Ethel Aldea and Glady Mabini)
 Saturday Rewind (with DJ Kleir)
 Sunday Buffet: All the Way! (with DJ Elanie)
 Gladly Yours (with Glady Mabini)

Syndicated programming
These programs are exclusively fed to select stations by the network, fed by a Radyo Natin affiliate to fellow Radyo Natin stations in their area, or fed by a blocktimer to select stations.
 Trans World Radio
 Kasangga ng Bayan with Larry Karangalan (Southern Luzon – Padre Garcia)
 Dok Alternatibo (blocktimer; selected stations only)
 The Voice of Prophecy (produced by Adventist World Radio)
 Kalusugan iwas Karamdaman (produced by Doc Samaritan Alternative Medicine and Wellness Center)
 MX3 Prayer Watch (Oras ng Panalangin) (produced by DMI-MX3)

Awards
Radyo Natin has been awarded as the Best Provincial FM Station in the Philippines for 4 consecutive years on the 21st, 22nd, 23rd and 26th KBP Golden Dove Awards (2012, 2013, 2014 and 2018).

Radyo Natin stations

References

External links
 Radyo Natin FM Official Website

 
Radio stations in the Philippines
Philippine radio networks
News and talk radio stations in the Philippines
OPM formatted radio stations in the Philippines
Manila Broadcasting Company